"The Big Apple" is a nickname for New York City. It was first popularized in the 1920s by John J. Fitz Gerald, a sportswriter for the New York Morning Telegraph. Its popularity since the 1970s is due in part to a promotional campaign by the New York tourist authorities.

Origin 
Although the history of Big Apple  was once thought a mystery, a clearer picture of the term's history has emerged due to the work of historian Barry Popik, and Gerald Cohen of the Missouri University of Science and Technology. A number of false theories had previously existed, including a claim that the term derived from a woman named Eve who ran a brothel in the city. This was subsequently exposed as a hoax.

The earliest known usage of "big apple" appears in the book The Wayfarer in New York (1909), in which Edward Sandford Martin writes: Kansas is apt to see in New York a greedy city ... It inclines to think that the big apple gets a disproportionate share of the national sap. William Safire considered this the coinage, but because the phrase is not quoted in the text, it is likely that it was used as a metaphor, and not as a nickname for the city.

Horse racing origin
The Big Apple was popularized as a name for New York City by John J. Fitz Gerald in a number of horse-racing articles for the New York Morning Telegraph in the 1920s. The earliest of these was a casual reference on 3 May 1921:

Fitz Gerald referred to the "big apple" frequently thereafter. He explained his use in a column dated February 18, 1924, under the headline "Around the Big Apple":

Fitz Gerald reportedly first heard "The Big Apple" used to describe New York's racetracks by two African American stable hands at the New Orleans Fair Grounds. Using racing records, Popik traced that conversation to January 1920.

In recognition of Fitz Gerald's role in promulgating "The Big Apple" as a nickname for New York City, in 1997 Mayor Rudy Giuliani signed legislation designating as "Big Apple Corner" the southwest corner of West 54th Street and Broadway, the corner on which John J. Fitz Gerald lived from 1934 to 1963.  The Hotel Ameritania also once had a plaque which was installed in 1996, according to Popik, but it was removed during renovations to the building and was lost.

Evidence can also be found in the Chicago Defender, an African-American newspaper that had a national circulation. Writing for the Defender on September 16, 1922, "Ragtime" Billy Tucker used the name "big apple" to refer to New York in a non-horse-racing context:

Tucker had also earlier used "big apple" as a reference to Los Angeles. It is possible that he simply used "big apple" as a nickname for any large city:

Popularity

By the late 1920s, New York writers other than Fitz Gerald were starting to use "Big Apple", and were using it in contexts other than horse racing. "The Big Apple" was a popular song and dance in the 1930s.  Jazz musicians in the 1930s also contributed to the use of the phrase to refer to New York City, specifically to the city and Harlem as the jazz capital of the world. Beside the song and the dance, two nightclubs in the city used "Big Apple" in their names.

Walter Winchell and other writers continued to use the term in the 1940s and early 1950s, but by the late 1950s, if it was known at all, it had come to be considered an outdated nickname for New York.

In the early 1970s, however, during the city's fiscal crisis, "People were looking around desperately and some of [them] seized that old phrase the Big Apple to remind people of when New York had been a strong and powerful city and might become that again," according to the official Manhattan Borough Historian, Dr. Robert Snyder.  It was then that the New York Convention and Visitors Bureau – now NYC & Company, New York City's official marketing and tourism organization) – with the help of the Ogilvy & Mather advertising firm, began to promote the city's "Big Apple" nickname to tourists, under the leadership of its president, Charles Gillett. The campaign was a success, and the nickname has remained popular since then.

Today the name is used exclusively to refer to New York City, and is used with regularity by journalists and news headline writers across the English-speaking world.

In popular culture
The term "big apple" was used by Frank Sinatra in conversation with opera singer Dorothy Kirsten on an episode of the NBC radio program Light Up Time on March 28, 1950.
The Big Apple Circus was founded in Manhattan in 1977.
The New York Mets baseball team have featured a "Home Run Apple" that rises whenever a Mets player hits a home run. It has become a symbol of the Mets baseball team, recognized throughout Major League Baseball as an iconic feature of the Mets' stadiums. It first appeared in Shea Stadium, and the original can still be seen on display at Citi Field, outside the Jackie Robinson Rotunda. Citi Field now uses a new apple, one that is much larger than original.
Uses of the term abound elsewhere in the names of cultural products and events in or concerning New York, including the Big Apple Anime Fest, the Big Apple Circus, the Big Apple Theater Festival, Jess Teong's The Kid from the Big Apple and Kajagoogoo's Big Apple, and playful uses of the nickname have been seen, such as Patrick Downey's 2008 historical study of New York City's criminal underworld, entitled Bad Seeds in the Big Apple.
Following his election as President of the United States in 2016, Donald Trump hosted a party named "The Big Apple Ball",  which featured themed decorations and cut-outs of New York landmarks in honor of his home city.
In his 1982 song "Human Nature", Michael Jackson refers to New York City by singing, "If this town is just an apple, then let me take a bite".
In Anchorman 2: The Legend Continues, when asked why New York is called 'The Big Apple', Ron Burgundy says, "Because, there's an apple tree on every corner!"

References

External links 

 The Big Apple Research on the term's history by  Barry Popik
 Straight Dope article

Culture of New York City
Symbols of New York City
Etymologies
Slang
American slang
City fruit nicknames